Highway 17 is a provincial highway in British Columbia, Canada. It comprises two separate sections connected by a ferry link. The Vancouver Island section is known as the Patricia Bay Highway and connects Victoria to the Swartz Bay ferry terminal in North Saanich. The Lower Mainland section is known as the South Fraser Perimeter Road and connects the Tsawwassen ferry terminal to Delta and Surrey, terminating at an interchange with Highway 1 in the Fraser Valley.

Route description

Vancouver Island section

The Island section of Highway 17 is known as the Patricia Bay Highway (locally abbreviated as the Pat Bay Highway) after nearby Patricia Bay, and is the main artery through the Saanich Peninsula, mostly travelling along its eastern coast. The highway is four lanes all the way from Victoria to Swartz Bay. Highway 17 has had its present course through the area since 1978 when the Blanshard extension was completed.

In the south, Highway 17 begins at the intersection of Belleville and Oswego streets, at the entrance to the Victoria Harbour ferry terminal, which provides a ferry connection to Port Angeles, Washington. After the third interchange at Royal Oak Drive, Highway 17 turns into a  mix of divided four-lane arterial and expressway including an interchange at McTavish Road, until it reaches the town of Sidney.

Ferry route

At Swartz Bay, Highway 17 leaves Vancouver Island, and starts on a 44 km (24 nmi)-long ferry route through the Southern Gulf Islands and the Strait of Georgia.  The ferry route between Swartz Bay and the Mainland is the oldest and most heavily used route in the B.C. Ferries system.  After winding through the Gulf Islands, the route enters a small passage between Galiano and Mayne Islands, known as Active Pass.  Active Pass is the midway point on the Highway 17 ferry route, but it is also the most hazardous part, as it has strong tidal currents, and has historically been the site of two maritime collisions involving BC Ferries vessels, as well as one incident of a ferry running aground.  Consequently, ferries going through Active Pass have to sound their whistles upon entering and leaving the passage, and must adhere to a lower speed limit while transiting through it.

After Active Pass, the Highway 17 ferry heads due northeast across the Strait of Georgia. Halfway across the Strait, the route begins transiting United States waters for just under 9 km (5 nmi). It then crosses the 49th parallel back into Canadian waters just before landing at the Tsawwassen Ferry Terminal.

Mainland section

On the Mainland, Highway 17 is known as the South Fraser Perimeter Road (SFPR), a component of the British Columbia Ministry of Transportation's Gateway Program. It is a four-lane highway with a mix of freeway and expressway sections. The mainland section is notable for its extensive use of noise walls, split level construction through Delta and use in some urban sections of so-called Quiet Pavement to reduce traffic noise.

The road then runs through the west side of Burns Bog, but avoiding the conservation area, and past the south side of the Tilbury and Sunbury industrial areas for  before it reaches the Fraser River at an interchange connecting to Highway 91 via Highway 91 Connector. It then proceeds east along the south bank of the Fraser River through North Delta and Surrey, passing under the Alex Fraser, Pattullo and Port Mann bridges, before turning southeast at Surrey Bend Regional Park to terminate at its junction with Highway 1 and Highway 15,  from Highway 91 Connector.

History

Vancouver Island Section 
Prior to 1978, the southern terminus of Highway 17 was at the present-day intersection of Highway 1 (Douglas Street) and Carey Road. In 1978, the highway was extended and aligned along Blanshard Street through Downtown Victoria to the Inner Harbour in an effort to improve traffic flow.

South Fraser Perimeter Road 
Route 17 once followed what is now Route 17A and terminated at the Highway 99 interchange before the George Massey Tunnel. The provincial government proposed to build a new expressway, the South Fraser Perimeter Road (SFPR), linking the Tsawwassen Ferry Terminal with the Trans-Canada Highway. According to the Ministry of Transportation, the South Fraser Perimeter Road will improve the movement of goods and people across the region while also alleviating truck traffic on municipal roads. West–east travel times across the region will also be significantly reduced.

The South Fraser Perimeter Road project was opposed by a number of groups, citing a variety of concerns. The SFPR alignment does not go through the Burns Bog Ecological Conservancy Area. However, the Burns Bog Conservation Society has stated they are concerned that it will affect surrounding hydrology, and have an adverse effect on the Conservancy Area.

The Burns Bog Conservation Society expressed concerns that the South Fraser Perimeter Road would endanger Burns Bog. In response to the mitigation measures proposed the Environmental Stewardship Branch of Environment Canada wrote that "... the changes are not sufficient to alleviate its concerns related to the impacts of the Project on Pacific Water Shrew (PWS), hydrology, aerial deposition, and ecological integrity of Burns Bog." On November 24, 2010 the Burns Bog Conservation Society launched a lawsuit intend to force the re-routing or cancellation of the SFPR project. Burns Bog has been listed as threatened by the International Mire Conservation Group because of the impacts of the SFPR.

The Wilderness Committee and other groups have criticized the SFPR, and the Gateway Program in general, for increasing greenhouse gas emissions. In early 2011, a protest camp organized by StopThePave.org and the Council of Canadians occupied a SFPR construction site for almost two weeks.

The SFPR Project worked with the Burns Bog Scientific Advisory Panel to develop systems, which helped improve the existing drainage / hydrology of the bog.

A  portion from 136 Street in Surrey to a junction with Highway 15 and Highway 1 was the first portion of the SFPR to be completed, opening on December 1, 2012.  The remaining western segment of the road was completed on December 21, 2013. The former Mainland portion of Highway 17 north of the 28th Avenue overpass has been renamed to Highway 17A through Ladner. The total cost of building the SFPR was $1.26 billion.

On March 10, 2017, an announcement was made to address congestion at Highway 17 (Delta): an extension of westbound slip lane from Tilbury Connector (80th Avenue) intersection, replacement of the traffic light-controlled Highway 91 Connector with an interchange, and construction of a new interchange at River Road. This would make the road a freeway all the way to Tannery Road. Funding will come from the Canadian government, the BC Government, the Vancouver Fraser Port Authority, and the Tsawwassen First Nation; the total cost is expected to be just over $245 million. Construction started in spring 2020 and the new River Road interchange opened on December 3, 2021. The new Highway 91 Connector interchange reached completion in November 2022.

Future
On Vancouver Island, there have been numerous studies to upgrade the Island portion of Highway 17 to freeway standard. This seems to be edging closer with the BC Government's issuing of the Highway 17 Corridor Planning Strategy. This study envisions interchanges at Haliburton, Sayward, Keating Cross Road and/or Island View, Mt Newton Cross Road, McTavish Road (Complete April 9, 2011) and Beacon Avenue in Sidney. Construction of a flyover ramp from northbound Highway 17 to Keating Cross Road is expected to commence in 2022.

As part of the Pattullo Bridge replacement project, the initial plan included a new interchange to provide direct connections to and from Highway 17 to the bridge as well as an extension of Scott Road north of King George Boulevard to directly connect with Highway 17 to divert traffic from local streets in Surrey. However, the project was down-scaled as the study showed Highway 17 cannot handle increased traffic from induced demand and the significant traffic delay would be expected on the provincial road network. Under the final proposal tendered in 2020, the only direct connection from the Pattullo Bridge would be from eastbound Pattullo Bridge to westbound, while Highway 17 and Old Yale Road intersection will be closed and grade-separated.

Major intersections

References

External links

 Official Numbered Routes in British Columbia
 Road to Ruin: Resisting the Gateway Freeway Expansion - a documentary about community resistance to expansion of Highway 17

017
Freeways in British Columbia
017
017
Transport in Surrey, British Columbia
Transport in Delta, British Columbia
Transport on Vancouver Island
1960 establishments in British Columbia